Marianne Muis (born 28 July 1968 in Amsterdam) is a female former medley and freestyle swimmer from the Netherlands.

Swimming career
Muis competed in three consecutive Summer Olympics for her native country, starting in 1988. There she won the silver medal with the Dutch women's 4×100 m freestyle relay team, behind East Germany. Her twin sister and three-time Olympian Mildred was on the same silver winning team.

Despite being of Dutch nationality she won the 200 metres medley title in 1988 at the ASA National British Championships.

References

External links 
 
 

1968 births
Living people
Olympic swimmers of the Netherlands
Dutch female medley swimmers
Swimmers at the 1988 Summer Olympics
Swimmers at the 1992 Summer Olympics
Swimmers at the 1996 Summer Olympics
Olympic silver medalists for the Netherlands
Dutch twins
Swimmers from Amsterdam
Dutch female freestyle swimmers
World Aquatics Championships medalists in swimming
Twin sportspeople
European Aquatics Championships medalists in swimming
Medalists at the 1988 Summer Olympics
Olympic silver medalists in swimming
Universiade medalists in swimming
Universiade silver medalists for the Netherlands
Universiade bronze medalists for the Netherlands
Medalists at the 1987 Summer Universiade
Medalists at the 1995 Summer Universiade
20th-century Dutch women